Lapeh Sara (also Romanized as Lapeh Sarā) is a village in Blukat Rural District, Rahmatabad and Blukat District, Rudbar County, Gilan Province, Iran. At the 2006 census, its population was 39, in 8 families.

References 

Populated places in Rudbar County